Italian American Motor Engineering (IAME) is an Italian company founded in 1968. It is the parent company of the "Parilla", "Komet" and "Sirio" brand names and is the largest kart engines manufacturer. Its factory is located in the province of Bergamo, Italy, near the city of Milan.

The company has won 25 Karting World Championships.

The manufacturer won the European Formula A championship in 2000 with Lewis Hamilton, in 2001 with Carlo Van Dam and in 2004 with Nick De Bruijn.

2005 and 2006 Formula One World Champion, Fernando Alonso, won the karting Junior World Cup in 1996 with a Parilla engine made by IAME.

In 2011, F1 GP winner Max Verstappen won the WSK Euro Series in an Parilla-powered CRG.

Aircraft engines
Aircraft engines produced by the Komet Flight Motor division of IAME include:
KFM 107 -  two cylinder, two stroke engine
KFM 112M -  four cylinder, four stroke engine

References

External links
IAME Official website

Kart manufacturers of Italy
Companies based in Bergamo
Two-stroke gasoline engines
Manufacturing companies established in 1968